Maceo may refer to:

Places
 Maceo, Antioquia, Colombia, a town and municipality
 Maceo, Kentucky, an unincorporated community

Other uses
 Maceo (name)